Lee Shin-hyung (born 2 March 2001) is a professional footballer who plays as a forward for Verbandsliga Nordbaden club Waldhof Mannheim II.

Career
After playing youth football for 1. FC Kaiserslautern and Astoria Walldorf, Lee made his professional debut for Waldhof Mannheim on 14 March 2021 in a 1–0 defeat at home to SV Meppen.

References

2001 births
Footballers from Seoul
Living people
South Korean footballers
Association football forwards
German footballers
1. FC Kaiserslautern players
FC Astoria Walldorf players
SV Waldhof Mannheim players
3. Liga players